Lizard Island is an island on the Great Barrier Reef in Queensland (Australia),  northwest of Brisbane and part of the Lizard Island Group that also includes Palfrey Island. It is part of the Lizard Island National Park. Lizard Island is within the locality of Lizard in the Cook Shire.

Geology

Lizard Island is a granite island about 10 square kilometres in size, with three smaller islands nearby (Palfrey, South and Bird).

History

Aboriginal
Lizard Island was known as Dyiigurra to the Dingaal Aboriginal people and was regarded as a sacred place. It was used by the people for the initiation of young males and for the harvesting of shellfish, turtles, dugongs and fish. The Dingaal believed that the Lizard group of islands had been created in the Dreamtime. They saw it as a stingray with Lizard Island being the body and the other islands in the group forming the tail. The local Dingiil Aboriginal people call the island Jiigurru.

European
The name Lizard Island was given to it by Captain Cook when he passed it on 12 August 1770. He commented, "The only land Animals we saw here were Lizards, and these seem'd to be pretty Plenty, which occasioned my naming the Island Lizard Island." Cook climbed the peak on Lizard Island to chart a course out to sea through the maze of reefs which confronted him and the island's summit has since been called 'Cook's Look'.

By the 1860s the island was being used by sea cucumber fishermen who found that the waters contained substantial quantities of the creature which was a popular delicacy in Asia.

In 1879, Captain Robert Watson with his wife Mary Watson, two servants and baby son, modified an abandoned cottage left on the island by the crew of the Julia Percy. The ruins are still visible. Captain Watson was a sea cucumber fisherman and during one of his absences, Aboriginal people from the mainland killed one of the servants. Mrs. Watson was only 21 when she arrived at Lizard Island and is famed for her courage and endurance. After the attack, accompanied by her child and the other Chinese servant, she attempted to flee to the mainland in an iron boiling tank (it can be seen in the Queensland Museum – it is a large rectangular tub) used for boiling sea cucumber. The vessel floated away from the coast and all three died of thirst nine days later on the waterless No 5 Howick Island. Their bodies were found three months later along with Mrs Watson's diary. The State Library of Queensland holds two diaries by Mrs Watson. One is about her last 9 months on Lizard Island and the other is notes documenting her last days. In retaliation to the attack, a punitive expedition was mounted against Aboriginal peoples.

In 1939, all of the islands in the group were declared a national park, which is now administered by the Queensland Parks and Wildlife Service. The island is also part of the Great Barrier Reef Marine Park, administered jointly by the Great Barrier Reef Marine Park Authority and the Queensland Environmental Protection Agency. Permits are required for all manipulative research in the Lizard Island Group and the waters surrounding it.

Heritage listings
Lizard Island has a number of heritage-listed sites, including:
 Lizard Island: Mrs Watson's Cottage

Lizards 
The most commonly found lizard on Lizard Island is the yellow-spotted monitor (Varanus panoptes).

Current settlement and use
Aside from the national park, Lizard Island also contains a number of other facilities:

Lizard Island Research Station

Situated on Lizard Island's most westerly point, the research station is operated by the Australian Museum, providing research and education facilities for those interested in studying coral reefs. As a result of research conducted at the station, about 1,000 scientific publications have been produced by Australian and international researchers since the station was set up in 1973.

Lizard Island Resort
On the island's north western side is an ultra luxury resort owned by Hong Kong listed property company Sea Holdings and operated by Voyages Hotels & Resorts until November 2009, the resort is now operated by Delaware North. The 40 villa resort focuses on providing seclusion and watersport activities that take advantage of the island's location on the Great Barrier Reef, including diving trips to the nearby Cod Hole.

See also

 Lizard Island Airport
 Protected areas of Queensland

References

Further reading 
 
 
 

National parks of Far North Queensland
Protected areas established in 1939
1939 establishments in Australia
Articles containing video clips
Lizard Island (Queensland)
Islands of Far North Queensland